Lone Wolf McQuade is a 1983 American Western film directed by Steve Carver and starring Chuck Norris, David Carradine, Barbara Carrera, L.Q. Jones, R.G. Armstrong, Leon Isaac Kennedy and Robert Beltran.

Plot

J.J. McQuade (Norris) is a former Marine and a Texas Ranger who prefers to work alone and carries a large .44 Magnum revolver for a duty sidearm. He lives in an old, run-down house in the middle of nowhere with a pet wolf.

The film opens with McQuade involved in an intense battle with Mexican bandits and a gang of horse thieves from which he emerges unscathed (saving several Texas State Troopers). Shaking off the dust, McQuade returns to El Paso, Texas to attend the retirement ceremony of his fellow Ranger and close friend Dakota (Jones). After the party, his commander attempts to curb his "lone wolf" attitude by insisting he work with local Texas State Trooper Kayo Ramos (Beltran), a tough but clean-cut and polite Latino.

Although divorced, McQuade is on very good terms with his ex-wife, and loves his teenage daughter Sally. McQuade also seems to like Sally's boyfriend Bobby, who is enlisted in the US Army and is respectful of McQuade being a retired Marine.

While out horseback riding with his daughter, his daughter's horse runs wild and she is saved by Lola Richardson (Carrera). She invites them to a party where Rawley Wilkes (Carradine) displays his prowess in martial arts and some of his thugs get into a fight with Ramos. After settling the fight, Richardson and McQuade leave the party and apparently have a romantic encounter. She shows up at his house and cleans it. Despite McQuade's annoyance that he does not need a woman to take care of him, Richardson seems to start breaking through his rough exterior within the couple of days they are together.

Meanwhile, Sally and Bobby witness the hijacking of a U.S. Army convoy. Bobby is shot and killed by the hijackers, who then cause Sally to be hospitalized when they shove her car into a ravine. McQuade more readily works with Kayo to find out who did this to his daughter and her boyfriend. Kayo's computer skills allow him to track the errant convoy. At an illegal garment factory, they pick up a young delinquent named Snow (William Sanderson), who is reluctant to talk until Dakota points a Mac-10 in his general direction and empties the magazine.

In retaliation for disrupting his operations, Wilkes asphyxiates Dakota in his house and also has Snow killed. Dakota's murder attracts the attention of FBI Special Agent Jackson (Kennedy) who works with Ramos and McQuade. The trail leads them to Wilkes, revealed as an arms merchant who is hijacking U.S. arms shipments for his illicit weapons deals.

The three eventually find the arms trading headquarters in the desert. Agents Burnside and Núñez are killed when they attack the headquarters. McQuade and Ramos had tried to stop them, but ended up in the gunfight as well. McQuade is caught and sadistically beaten by Wilkes, who then orders that McQuade be placed in his truck and buried under a truckload of dirt, ignoring Richardson's pleas for mercy for the three men. After regaining consciousness in his truck (a Dodge Ramcharger, 1983 model), McQuade produces a beer and pours it over his face. Then, using his homemade supercharger system, McQuade charges his truck through the dirt – miraculously breaking himself free – and then rescues Ramos and Jackson. All three men are weakened due to being shot and beaten.

McQuade finds that Sally has been taken by Wilkes to Mexico. A rival arms dealer known as Falcon, who has been disguising his illegal business as a pinball machine dealer supplies McQuade with this intelligence, claiming Wilkes has double-crossed him and he would like his competition eliminated. Falcon gives McQuade the exact location in Mexico where Wilkes and his daughter are.

Though McQuade is intent and tries to head to the location on his own, both Ramos and Jackson have followed him and the three head into the base for the attack. After an intense battle, with Jackson being shot again, and Sally and Richardson escaping, Sally is shot in the leg and both women are sidelined.

Finally McQuade and Wilkes engage a hand-to-hand fight with the fight leaning in Wilkes' favor, until he strikes Sally (who ran to her father's aid), provoking McQuade into a frenzy of hits and kicks that defeats Wilkes. McQuade is reunited with his daughter, only to be fired upon by an injured Wilkes. Richardson steps into the line of fire to save McQuade and is fatally wounded. Her dying words to McQuade are that Wilkes killed her husband, forced her to be his arm candy, and that she loved McQuade.

Meanwhile, Wilkes and his remaining thug run into a building. Jackson provides McQuade with a grenade, and McQuade throws it into the building, killing Wilkes and the other man. Falcon then arrives in his helicopter. McQuade, Sally, Ramos, and Jackson take it, leaving Falcon to deal with the Mexican "federales".

McQuade's ex-wife and daughter are at a ceremony where McQuade's commander presents him (as well as Ramos and Jackson) with the Texas Award of Valor, and McQuade congratulates his ex-wife for getting an excellent job in New Mexico. The following day, McQuade has rented a U-Haul and is helping Sally and his ex-wife move. As they are getting ready to leave, Ramos shows up telling McQuade he is needed as a gunman has held up a bank. Figuring he has had enough adventure and wanting to spend more time with his family, McQuade politely declines. However, when Ramos also warns that the robber has taken hostages, McQuade is spurred into action. As the squad car speeds off, his ex-wife bellows "J.J. McQuade, you will never change!"

Cast

 Chuck Norris as Ranger Jim "J.J." McQuade
 David Carradine as Rawley Wilkes
 Barbara Carrera as Lola Richardson
 Robert Beltran as Deputy Arcadio "Kayo" Ramos
 Leon Isaac Kennedy as FBI Agent Marcus Jackson
 John Anderson as ATF Agent Burnside
 L.Q. Jones as Ranger Dakota Brown
 Dana Kimmell as Sally McQuade
 R.G. Armstrong as Captain T. Tyler
 Tommy Ballard as Colonel Remsing
 Oscar Hidalgo as Deputy Oscar Garcia 
 Jorge Cervera Jr. as "Jefe"
 Sharon Farrell as Molly McQuade
 Anthony Caglia as Intern
 Robert Jordan as Bobby Drew
 Daniel Frishman as Emilio Falcon
 Hector Serrano as Cuban
 William Sanderson as "Snow"
 Aaron Norris as Punk
 Ray Marker as Soldier (uncredited)
 Kale Stokerton as Rude Man In The Pub (uncredited)
 Kane Hodder as Goon (uncredited) 
 David Lee Smith as Pilot

Production

Development
Director Steve Carver had previously worked with Chuck Norris on the film A Eye for an Eye.

BJ Nelson wrote the script and all drafts. It was originally called Lone Wolf". He wrote all drafts and was not rewritten. Kaye Dyal only assisted with story ideas late in the process anda John Milius suggested a few details. Nelson wanted Clint Eastwood to play the role but after he passed, Carver thought Chuck Norris would be ideal to play the lead so he approached him to do the film.

Carver wanted to "mess up" Chuck Norris' image, having him grow a beard and drink beer on screen. Norris was reluctant as he wanted to be a good role model for children.

Carver and Nelson were fans of director Sergio Leone and made the film in the style of Leone.

Filming
Chuck Norris and David Carradine refused to use stunt doubles for their climactic fight scene, despite strong reservations from the producers. "The thing about the fight with Dave is that not only is it very well done, but it and the other martial-arts scenes are not just fillers," said Norris. "You've got to have more than technique if you're going to capture the emotions of the audience."

Carradine said Norris wanted to do a fight that matched the one Norris did with Bruce Lee in the Roman Coliseum in Way of the Dragon "and we were actually trying to go beyond that. I think we did. I think photographically we didn’t. But as far as the fight was concerned, the combination of the two styles, you know, because I was very flowing and loose, and he was very solid and hard, I think we accomplished what we set out to do."

Carradine said the fight was shot over four days and "we were little old men by the end of it. All our old injuries came back, we got new injuries, and we were 
stumbling around like little old men."

Carradine said Steve Carver was "probably the best director Chuck has ever had" adding that:
Chuck had a feeling when I was working with him, that he wanted to be a better actor. At one point, when we were working on the fight, I got close to him, and I said. This is really right man, puttin' your face in the dirt.’ And he looked at me, you know, and he didn’t expect that from me. And we got to be buddies. For just that period. I don’t hang around with Chuck. Chuck mainly doesn’t like to work with co-stars. His movies are all solo movies.In an interview in 2020, Steve Carver said Chuck Norris was "easy to work with". He added that athletes "think differently than trained theatre actors. If you block a scene with an athlete, if you ask an athlete to move from point A to B, or to pick up something, or do anything, he will do these movements mechanically. Which is not a bad thing, because with every rehearsal the movement becomes more fluid. Whereas a theatre actor will project their movements and their dialogue. It’s a stage to them. That’s the difference. Chuck was a little bit stiff in An Eye For An Eye. He became looser in Lone Wolf McQuade. After that he became better with every picture he did."

Release
Rating
The film was originally rated "R" but Chuck Norris appealed the decision to the MPAA and succeeded in getting the film rated PG.

"This is the second time I've appealed," said Norris. "They gave Good Guys Wear Black an R, but I persuaded them to make it a PG. My argument was the strong, positive image I project on the screen. The word karate, unfortunately, connotes violence to many people. Actually, it's a means of avoiding violent situations, and a form of defense if you have no choice and you're backed into a corner.... My films are very similar to the John Wayne movies of the '40s. He'd go in a bar and Jack Palance would pick a fight with him, and then Wayne would take out half the saloon. It's the same theme: A man is pushed into a situation where he has to resort to violence."

Reception
Box officeLone Wolf McQuade grossed $12 million in USA.

Critical response
Roger Ebert rated the film three-and-a-half stars out of four and compared Norris and his character favorably to the roles Clint Eastwood used to play in spaghetti Westerns. Vincent Canby of The New York Times called Norris "good" and further noted: "The plot, set in and around El Paso, is unimportant and nonstop, like an old-fashioned, Saturday afternoon serial, which isn't at all bad. Steve Carver, the director, understands that in such films action is content." Todd McCarthy of Variety wrote, "Fans of Soldier of Fortune magazine will think they've been ambushed and blown away to heaven by 'Lone Wolf McQuade.' Every conceivable type of portable weapon on the world market today is tried out by the macho warriors on both sides of the law in this modern western, which pits Texas Ranger Chuck Norris and his cohorts against multifarious baddies who like to play rough." Gene Siskel of the Chicago Tribune gave the film two-and-a-half stars out of four and wrote, "The rhythm here is seven minutes of action, followed by a minute of dialogue, followed by another seven minutes of action. For a while I was laughing at all of the explosions; eventually, though, all of the noise became annoying." Kevin Thomas of the Los Angeles Times thought that the film, "like its predecessor, 'Forced Vengeance,' becomes so numbingly violent that it's a turnoff about a third of the way through." Jimmy Summers wrote in BoxOffice magazine, "Chuck Norris still doesn't have the screen presence to achieve his often-repeated wish of becoming the next John Wayne, but as long as he keeps his feet and fists flying and stays relatively quiet he's an effective action hero. In the wildly exaggerated world of this movie, he's almost a super-hero."

As of December 2019 the film has a score of 57% on review aggregator Rotten Tomatoes based on 7 reviews.

Legacy
Norris later said the film "broke the kung fu mode" for him and helped turn him into a more mainstream action star.

Norris credits this film as a leading inspiration for his hit television series, Walker, Texas Ranger, which premiered a decade later. Yet the pilot had to be rewritten, and the characters' names changed, since "all things McQuade" were copyrighted by Orion Pictures. The original co-producer of the series was The Cannon Group, which like Orion is now absorbed into Metro-Goldwyn-Mayer (though the Cannon films are distributed on television by another company).

Steve Carver and his production partner Yoram Ben-Ami sued the producers of Walker, Texas Rangers for 500 million dollars. Carver talked about the lawsuit in an interview in 2020: "MGM and CBS had bigger and better and more lawyers than we did, all the way to the Supreme Court. We failed to convince the Supreme Court that there were similarities. Now, you and I and anybody else knows that there are similarities between Lone Wolf McQuade and Walker Texas Ranger''." He added that the lawsuit was the reason Chuck Norris and he parted ways.

See also
 List of American films of 1983
 Chuck Norris filmography

References

External links
 
 
 
 
 
 

1983 films
1983 Western (genre) films
American Western (genre) films
American action films
American martial arts films
1980s Spanish-language films
Orion Pictures films
Films about the Texas Ranger Division
Films set in Texas
Films shot in El Paso, Texas
Films directed by Steve Carver
Films scored by Francesco De Masi
Fictional characters of the Texas Ranger Division
Bureau of Alcohol, Tobacco, Firearms and Explosives in fiction
Neo-Western films
1980s English-language films
1980s American films